In baseball statistics, games started (denoted by GS) indicates the number of games that a pitcher has started for his team. A pitcher is credited with starting the game if he throws the first pitch to the first opposing batter. If a player is listed in the starting lineup as the team's pitcher, but is replaced before facing an opposing batter, the player is credited with a game pitched but not a game started; there have been instances in major league history in which a starting pitcher was removed before his first pitch due to an injury, perhaps suffered while batting or running the bases during the top half of the first inning.

The all-time leader for games started is Cy Young with 815 over a 22-year career. The players with the most starts in a single season are Pud Galvin and Will White, each with 75 games started.

For position players, games started is also used to denote the number of times their names appear in a team's starting lineup during the season.

The statistic is also used in football.

See also

List of Major League Baseball leaders in games started
List of Major League Baseball leaders in games finished
Complete game
Shutouts in baseball

References

Pitching statistics